Orlando Prado (born 16 February 1972) is a Peruvian footballer. He played in five matches for the Peru national football team in 1997. He was also part of Peru's squad for the 1997 Copa América tournament.

References

External links
 

1972 births
Living people
Peruvian footballers
Peru international footballers
Association football defenders
Sportspeople from Callao